Bramntio Ramadhan Heriansyah (born 17 November 2001) is an Indonesian professional footballer who plays as a forward for Liga 2 club Deltras, on loan from Arema.

Club career

Arema
He was signed for Arema to play in Liga 1 in the 2021 season. Bramntio made his first-team debut on 3 October 2021 as a substitute in a match against Persela Lamongan at the Gelora Bung Karno Madya Stadium, Jakarta. He scored his first goal on 7 June 2022 in friendly match against RANS Nusantara at Kanjuruhan Stadium.

Deltras (loan)
On 2 August 2022, Bramntio joined Liga 2 club Deltras on loan.

Career statistics

Club

Notes

Honours

Club
Arema
Indonesia President's Cup: 2022

References

External links
 Bramntio Ramadhan at Soccerway
 Bramntio Ramadhan at Liga Indonesia

2001 births
Living people
Indonesian footballers
Liga 1 (Indonesia) players
Liga 2 (Indonesia) players
Arema F.C. players
Deltras F.C. players
Association football forwards
People from Probolinggo
Sportspeople from East Java